Lord Krishna Bank was a private sector bank headquartered at Kodungallur, in Thrissur District of Kerala state in India. The bank was founded in 1940. The bank was founded by Sri. Narayana Prabhu at Kodungallur. In the 1960s, it acquired three commercial banks:

Kerala Union Bank (est. 22 September 1952):
Thiyya Bank, which was established in 1941, and merged on 16 November 1964;
Josna Bank, which was established on 12 June 1944 in Cochin by N. Govinda Pai and N. Lakshmana Pai, of the Gowda Saraswath Brahmin community. In 1961, Josna Bank acquired the assets and liabilities of the Tripunithura Union Bank (est. 23 July 1929). The merger between Josna Bank and Lord Krishna Bank was effective 13 October 1965. At the time Josna Bank had 14 branches.

Lord Krishna Bank became a scheduled commercial bank in 1971. In 2007, Lord Krishna Bank was merged with Centurion Bank of Punjab.

See also
 Kerala Bank

References

Defunct banks of India
Banks based in Thrissur
Banks established in 1940
Banks disestablished in 2007
Indian companies established in 1940
Indian companies disestablished in 2007